Emile Raymond Baron (born 17 June 1979) is a South African retired association football goalkeeper who has played for South Africa.

International career
Baron made his international debut in a friendly against Saudi Arabia on 20 March 2002 and has so far been capped 4 times. He was also a participant at the 2004 African Nations Cup. In April 2010, he got a shoulder injury which caused him to miss the 2010 FIFA World Cup.

References

External links

1979 births
Living people
People from Fish Hoek
South African soccer players
South Africa international soccer players
Association football goalkeepers
Lillestrøm SK players
Cape Coloureds
Kniksen Award winners
Footballers at the 2000 Summer Olympics
Olympic soccer players of South Africa
2004 African Cup of Nations players
Kaizer Chiefs F.C. players
South African expatriate soccer players
Expatriate footballers in Norway
South African expatriate sportspeople in Norway
SuperSport United F.C. players
Hellenic F.C. players
Eliteserien players
Bidvest Wits F.C. players
Soccer players from the Western Cape